The Codex Bezae Cantabrigiensis, designated by siglum D or 05 (in the Gregory-Aland numbering of New Testament manuscripts), δ 5 (in the von Soden of New Testament manuscript), is a codex of the New Testament dating from the 5th century written in an uncial hand on vellum. It contains, in both Greek and Latin, most of the four Gospels and Acts, with a small fragment of 3 John.
 
A digital facsimile of the codex is available from Cambridge University Library, which holds the manuscript.

Description 
The codex contains 406 extant parchment leaves, from perhaps an original 534 (26 x 21.5 cm), written one column per page with the Greek text on the left face and the Latin text on the right. The text is written colometrically and is full of hiatus. The first three lines of each book are in red letters, and black and red ink alternate the title of books. As many as eleven correctors (G, A, C, B, D, E, H, F, J1, L, K) have amended the text of the manuscript between the sixth and twelfth centuries.

The following nomina sacra are written in an abbreviated form:  (Iēsous 'Jesus'),  (Christos 'Christ'),  (patēr 'Father'),  (staurōthē '[he] was crucified'). Other words which usually feature among the nomina sacra are written out in full:  (mēter 'Mother', huios 'Son', sōter 'savior', anthrōpos 'man', ouranos 'sky, David, Israēl, Iērousalēm).

 Codex contents 
The manuscript presents the gospels in the Western order Matthew, John, Luke and Mark, of which only Luke is complete; after some missing pages the manuscript picks up with the Third Epistle of John (in Latin) and contains part of Acts.

 Lacunae
 Matthew 1:1–20, 6:20–9:2, 27:2–12; John 1:16–3:26; Acts 8:29–10:14, 21:2–10, 21:16–18, 22:10–20, 22:29–end

 Omitted verses
 Matthew ; ; ; ; ; ; 
 Mark 
 Luke ; ; ; ; ; ; ; ; 
 John 

 Supplementations (by a later hand)
 Matthew 3:7–16; Mark 16:15–20; John 18:14–20:13

 Text type 
The Greek text is unique, with many interpolations found in no other manuscript. It has several remarkable omissions, and a capricious tendency to rephrase sentences. Aside from this one Greek manuscript, the type of text is found in Old Latin (pre-Vulgate) versions — as seen in the Latin here — and in Syriac, and Armenian versions. Bezae is the principal Greek representative of the Western text-type.

There is no consensus on the many problems the Greek text presents. Since the Latin text occasionally agrees with Codices Bobiensis and Vercellensis against all others, it "preserves an ancient form of the Old Latin", and is a witness to a text which was current no later than 250 CE. Issues of conformity have dogged the usage of the codex in biblical scholarship. "In general the Greek text is treated as an unreliable witness," but it is "an important corroborating witness wherever it agrees with other early manuscripts."

Some of the outstanding features: Matthew 16:2b–3 is present and not marked as doubtful or spurious. One of the longer endings of Mark is given. Luke 22:43f and Pericope de adultera are present and not marked as spurious or doubtful. John 5:4 is omitted, and the text of Acts is nearly 8% longer than the generally received text.

Acts in Codex Bezae differs quite considerably from other manuscripts, which some argue possibly represents an earlier version directly from Luke.

 Notable readings 

Codex Bezae Cantabrigiensis contains some extraordinary readings. Below is a selection of some of the more notable or unsupported readings, with text and translation.

{{show
|head-style = background-color: #F0F8FF; text-align: left;
|content-style = background-color: #FFFFFF; text-align: left;
|1 = 
|2 = 
 (through Isaiah the prophet) : D it vg syr sa arm Diatessaron Irenaeus
 (through the prophet) : Majority Byz

 (by the LORD through Jeremiah) : D it
 (through Jeremiah) :  B C al (by Jeremiah) : Majority Byz

 (descending out of heaven like a dove) :  D it vg syr
 (deceding like a dove) : Majority Byz

 (proceeds out through the mouth)
Omit. : D it
Incl. : Majority Byz

 Matt 5:5, 4: D 17. 33. 130. lat syr Clement Origen Eusebius
 Matt 5:4,5 : Majority Byz

 (falsely)
Omit. : D b c d g h k syr Tertullian Augustine
Incl. : Majority Byz

 (for the sake of righteousness) : D it
 (for my sake) : Majority Byz

 (but whoever will do [them] and should teach [them], the same will be called great in the kingdom of the heavens)
Omit. : D * W bo
Incl. : Majority Byz

 (and whoever should marry her who is divorced, he commits adultery)
Omit. : D it Origen
Incl. : Majority Byz

 : D L W Δ Θ 047 ƒ 33. 118. 700. 892. Byz lat syr mae-1 goth Clement Eusebius
 :  B ƒ 22 279 660* 1192 2786* it syr sa bo Irenaeus Origen Cyprian

 (shut the door and pray to your Father in secret) : D ƒ ƒ 700. syr bo
 (shut the door and pray to your Father who is in secret) : Majority Byz

 (open your mouth) :  D it
 (ask him) : Majority Byz

 (Lebbaeus) : D it Origen
 (Thaddeus) :  B 124 788. 892. 2211. f 17. 130. 892. it vg sa bo
 (Lebbaeus, called Thaddeus) : C L W X Δ Θ ƒ ƒ 22. 33. 565. 579. 700. Byz it syr arm
 Judas Zelotes (Judas the Zealot) : it
 omit. : syr

 (that house or)
Omit. : D arm
Incl. : Majority Byz

 (you shall be caused to stand before governors)
Incl. : D 0171 it syr
Omit. : Majority Byz

 (for it will be given to you in that hour what you should speak)
Omit. : D L it vg Epiphanius
Incl. : Majority Byz

 (Are you the one who is to labor) : D*
 (Are you the one who is to come) : Majority Byz

 (and the lame are walking)
Omit. : D
Incl. : Majority Byz

 (speaks good) : D* it
 (speaks) : Majority Byz (Go, and tell the people this) 
Incl. : D it mae-1 Eusebius
Omit. : Majority Byz (he spoke to them) 
Omit. : D it syr
Incl. : Majority Byz : (cosmos) D (this age) : N co
 (age) : Majority Byz (whom I beheaded) 
Incl. : D it vg
Omit. : Majority Byz (of Philip)
Omit. : D it vg Augustine
Incl. : Majority Byz (on a platter)
Omit. : DIncl. : Majority Byz (it is not permitted) : D it syr Origen
 (it is not) : 1293. Tertullian Eusebius
 (right it is not) : 544. 1010. geo
 (it is not right) : Majority Byz (mute)
Omit. : DIncl. : Majority Byz

 (and he healed them all) : D it sa bo
 (and he healed them) : Majority Byz (lest they should faint in the way)
Omit. : D*
Incl. : Majority Byz (Magadan) : * B D (Magedan) :  Δ lat syr co Eusebius
 (Magdalan) : C N W 33. 565. 579. it mae-1 co
 (Magdala) : L Δ Θ ƒ ƒ 22 892. Byz syr (and adulterous)
Omit. : D it
Incl. : Majority Byz (the son of the saving God) : D*
 (the son of the living God) : Majority Byz (rebuked) : D B* it syr Origen
 (ordered) : Majority Byz (very high mountain) : D Eusebius
 (high mountain by themselves) : Majority Byz (white as snow) : D lat syr bo
 (white as the light) : Majority Byz (So also the Son of Man is about to suffer at their hands)
Incl. in 17:12 : Majority Byz
Place in 17:13 : D it (these little ones who believe in me) : D it vg syr co
 (these little ones) : Majority Byz μαρτύρων (witnesses) : Majority Byz
 omit : D omit: D* it
 (will be bound in heaven, and whatever you should loosen upon the earth) : Majority Byz (they were astonished and they were afraid exceedingly) : D it vg syr
 omit : Majority Byz (or father)
Incl. : Majority Byz
Omit. : D (or wife)
Incl. : Majority Byz
Omit. : D But seek to increase from that which is small, and to become less from that which is greater. When you enter into a house and are summoned to dine, do not sit down at the prominent places, lest perchance a man more honorable than you come in afterwards, and he who invited you come and say to you, "Go down lower"; and you shall be ashamed. But if you sit down in the inferior place, and one inferior to you come in, then he that invited you will say to you, "Go up higher"; and this will be advantageous for you.
Incl. : D Φ it vg syr Juvencus Hilary
Omit. : Majority ByzOmit. : D  33 it syr Irenaeus Origen Eusebius
Incl. : Majority Byz (Take him by his feet and his hands and cast him into the outer darkness) : D it syr Irenaeus Lucifer
 (After binding him by his feet and his hands, cast him into the outer darkness) :  B L Θ 085 ƒ 22 700. 892. it vg syr co Didymus
 (After binding him by his feet and his hands, take and cast him into the outer darkness) : C (M) W Δ (Φ) 0102 33. (565.)(579.) (1241.) (1424.) Byz it syr
 (cast [him] into the outer darkness) : ƒ (Therefore, tell us)
Omit. : D it syr bo
Incl. : Majority Byz (his wife)
Omit. : DIncl. : Majority Byz (from that hour) : D W ƒ 1506 it syr bo Origen
 (from that day) : Majority Byz (and the plate) 
Omit. : D Θ ƒ 2* 700. it syr Irenaeus Clement 
Incl. : Majority Byz (and of them, ye will scourge in your synagogues)
Omit. : D it Lucifer
Incl. : Majority Byz (But when these things begin happening, look up and lift up your heads, because that your redemption is approaching)
Incl. : D 1093. it
Omit. : Majority Byz (two upon one bed; one taken, and one left) 
Incl. : D ƒ it vg Origen
Omit. : Majority Byz
}}

{{show
|head-style = background-color: #F0F8FF; text-align: left;
|content-style = background-color: #FFFFFF; text-align: left;
|1 = 
|2 =  (touched) : D*
 (unrolled) :  D K Δ Θ Π Ψ ƒ ƒ 28. 565. 700. 1009. 1010. 1071. 1079. 1216. 1230. 1242. 1253. 1344. 1546. 1646. 2148. 2174. Byz
 (opened) : A B L W Ξ 33. 892. 1195. 1241. ℓ 547 syr bo sa'''
 (On that same day, seeing someone working on the Sabbath, he (Jesus) said to him, 'Man, if you know what you do, blessed are you; but if you do not know, you are cursed and a transgressor of the law.)
Incl. : D
Omit. : Majority Byz

 : D (it syr
 : Majority Byz

 (slave) : D
 (boy servant): Majority Byz

 (But He turned and rebuked them and He said: You do not know what manner of spirit you are of) : D (ℓ 1127) D geo Epiphanius
 : Byz
Omit. :  A B C L Δ Ξ 28. 33. 71. 157. al (Let thine kingdom come upon us) : D
 (May your Holy Spirit come upon us and cleanse us) : 162. 700.
 (May your kingdom come) : Byz
 (May your kingdom come) : C P W Δ ƒ 1241
Omit. : geo

 : D Codex Regius
 : Majority Byz

 (Then Jesus said, "Father, forgive them, for they know not what they are doing")
Omit. :   B D W Θ 0124 31.* 38. 435. 597.* 1241. 1808.* it syr co
Incl. : Majority Byz

 (aromatics) 
Omit. : D it syr co
Incl. : Majority Byz

 (Then, upon arriving, they found)
Omit. : D 070 it sa
Incl. : Majority Byz

 (the Lord Jesus) 
Omit. : D it
Incl. : Majority Byz

Omit. : D it arm geo
Incl. : Majority Byz

 (sinful)
Omit. : D it
Incl. : Majority Byz

 (from the tomb)
Omit. : D it arm geo
Incl. : Majority Byz

 (Now they were) 
Omit. : A D W Γ 788. 1241. ℓ it syr
Incl. : Majority Byz

 (and they stood still)
Omit. : D Cyril
Incl. : Majority Byz

 (and said to them, "Peace be unto you")
Omit. : D it,l,r
Incl. : Majority Byz

 (phantasma) : D Marcion
 (spirit) : Majority Byz

 (and honeycomb of the beehive)
Omit. :   A B D L W P 579. 1079. 1377.* 2411. it syr sa bo
Incl. : Majority Byz

 (from the dead)
Omit. : D sa
Incl. : Majority Byz

 (my Father) 
Omit. : D it
Incl. : Majority Byz

 (and he was being uplifted into the sky)
Omit. : * D it
Incl. : Majority Byz

 (upon worshiping him)
Omit. : D it syr
Incl. : Majority Byz

 (praising) D it vg
 (eulogizing)   B C* L syr sa bo geo
 (praising and eulogizing) A C W Δ Θ Ψ ƒ ƒ 33 157 579 Byz it vg syr arm
}}

 History 
The place of origin of the codex is still disputed; both Gaul (current France) and southern Italy have been suggested.

The manuscript is believed to have been repaired at Lyon in the ninth century, as revealed by a distinctive ink used for supplementary pages. It was closely guarded for many centuries in the monastic library of St Irenaeus at Lyon. The manuscript was consulted, perhaps in Italy, for disputed readings at the Council of Trent, and was at about the same time collated for Stephanus's edition of the Greek New Testament. During the upheavals of the Wars of Religion in the 16th century, when textual analysis had a new urgency among the Reformation's Protestants, the manuscript was stolen from the monastic library in Lyon when French Huguenots ransacked the library in 1562. It was delivered to the Protestant scholar Theodore Beza, the friend and successor of Calvin, who gave it in 1581 to the University of Cambridge, in the comparative security of England, which accounts for its double name. It remains in the Cambridge University Library (Nn. II 41).

John Mill collated and Johann Jakob Wettstein transcribed (1716) the text of the codex. Both did their editions of the Greek Testament, but both did their work carelessly. A much better collation was made about 1732 by John Dickinson.

The University of Cambridge in 1787 appointed Dr Thomas Kipling to edit a facsimile edition which appeared in two volumes in 1793.

The English cleric Frederick Henry Ambrose Scrivener edited the text of the codex in 1864 (rewritten text of the codex) and in 1899 (photographic facsimile).

The importance of the Codex Bezae is such that a colloquium held at Lunel, Hérault, in the south of France on 27–30 June 1994 was entirely devoted to it. Papers discussed the many questions it poses to our understanding of the use of the Gospels and Acts in early Christianity, and of the text of the New Testament.

 See also 
 Biblical manuscript
 Codex Glazier
 List of New Testament Latin manuscripts
 List of New Testament uncials
 Western non-interpolations

 References 

 Further reading 
 Christian-B. Amphoux, «La grande lacune du Codex de Bèze.» , Vol. 17 (2004) 3–26
 F. H. Chase, The Old Syriac Element in the Text of Codex Bezae. MacMillan, 1893.
 
 
 M.-É. Boismard – A. Lamouille, Le texte occidental des Actes des Apôtres. Reconstitution et réhabilitation, 2 vol., Paris 1984.
 F. G. Kenyon, Codex Bezae (1901) JTS, pp. 293–299, at the Internet Archive A. F. J. Klijn, A Survey of the Researches Into the Western Text of the Gospels and Acts (1949–1959), Novum Testamentum, Volume 3, Numbers 1–2, 1959, pp. 1–53.
 W. A. Strange, The Problem of the Text of Acts, (SNTS MS, 71), Cambridge 1992.
 
 Codex Bezae, Studies from the Lunel Colloquium, June 1994, ed. D.C. Parker & C.-B. Amphoux, Leiden: Brill, 1996.
 
 Weiss Bernard, Der Codex D in der Apostelgeschichte, Texte und Untersuchungen (Leipzig 1897)
 James D. Yoder, Concordance to the distinctive Greek text of Codex Bezae 1961
 
 L’Évangile de Luc et les Actes des Apôtres selon le Codex Bezae Cantabrigiensis, annotated translation by Sylvie Chabert d’Hyères. Paris: L’Harmattan, 422 p., 2009.

 External links 

 High resolution digital facsimile of the Codex Bezae with full transcription, from Cambridge University Library
 R. Waltz, Codex Bezae at the Encyclopedia of Textual Criticism'' (2007)
 Bible Researcher website discusses the Codex Bezae
 The Gospels and Acts according to codex Bezae; greek and latin text, translation and comments
 History of Research on Codex Bezae
 Codex Bezae and the Da Vinci Code The alleged parchment 1 has been copied from Codex Bezae
 Real secrets and hoaxes, of Da Vinci Code, Rennes-le-Château and Codex Bezae, analyzed on the "Mercure de Gaillon"
 Codex Bezae and Codex Claromontanus 
 Catholic Encyclopedia 1910: Codex Bezae
 More information at Earlier Latin Manuscripts

Bezae
Vetus Latina New Testament manuscripts
5th-century biblical manuscripts
Manuscripts in Cambridge